The rock sculpture of Decebalus is a colossal carving of the face of Decebalus (r. AD 87–106), the last king of Dacia, who fought against the Roman emperors Domitian and Trajan to preserve the independence of his country, which corresponds to present-day Romania. 

The sculpture is located near the city of Orșova, in Mehedinți County. It was made between 1994 and 2004, on a rocky outcrop on the river Danube, at the Iron Gates, which form the border between Romania and Serbia.

Creation
It was commissioned by Romanian businessman Iosif Constantin Drăgan and it took 10 years for twelve sculptors to complete it. The lead artist sculptor was Florin Cotarcea, from Orșova. According to Drăgan's website, the businessman purchased the rock in 1992, after which the Italian sculptor Mario Galeotti assessed the location and made an initial model. The first six years involved dynamiting the rock into the basic shape, and the remaining four years were devoted to completing the detail. 

Under the face of Decebalus there is a Latin inscription which reads "DECEBALUS REX—DRAGAN FECIT" ("King Decebalus—Made by Drăgan"). The carving was placed opposite an ancient memorial plaque, carved in the rock on the Serbian side of the river facing Romania. The plaque, known as the Tabula Traiana, records the completion of Trajan's military road along the Danube and thus commemorates the final defeat of Decebalus by Trajan in 105, and the absorption of the Dacian kingdom into the Roman Empire. Drăgan wanted the Serbs to carve a giant head of a Roman Emperor, as if confronting Decebalus on the opposite side of the river, but the Serbs refused.

Significance
Drăgan was a leading figure in the protochronism and Dacianism movements, nationalist ideologies which attempted to portray Romania as the major cradle of civilisation and which identified Romania with the Dacians and an ancient Thracian empire that supposedly dominated central Europe. In this ideology, Dacia, the pre-Roman name of Romania, was the inheritor of this Thracian culture, a view expounded by Drăgan in his book and journal Noì, tracii ("We Thracians"). 

The Fundația Europeană Drăgan, Drăgan's foundation, states that "Giuseppe Costantino Dragan is a strong supporter of the theory that the original 'flame' of civilization started on the ancient territory of Romania and argues as much in his work". Drăgan saw the sculpture as a signpost to the cradle of civilisation. He is quoted saying, "Anyone travelling towards 'Decebal Rex Dragan Fecit' is also travelling towards the origins of European civilization and will discover that a United Europe represents the natural course of history".

Descriptions
Michael Palin in his 2007 book New Europe described the colossal head: 

Nick Thorpe in The Danube: A Journey Upriver from the Black Sea to the Black Forest writes,

See also 
Tourism in Romania
Seven Wonders of Romania
List of colossal sculpture in situ

References

External links
Sculpture of Decebalus  
Official website: Dragan European Foundation

Mountain monuments and memorials
Outdoor sculptures in Romania
Stone sculptures in Romania
Monuments and memorials in Romania
2004 sculptures
Colossal statues
Dacia in art
Buildings and structures in Mehedinți County